The martyrs of Turon were a group of eight members of the Catholic, religious-teaching congregation Institute of the Brothers of the Christian Schools, also known as De La Salle Brothers, and one Passionist priest who were executed by insurrectionists in Spain, during the Asturias uprising of October 1934. They were canonized in 1999 by Pope John Paul II.

Background
In 1934 Turón, a coal-mining town in the Asturias Province in Northwestern Spain, was the centre of anti-government and anticlerical hostility in the years prior to the outbreak of the Spanish Civil War. The eight de la Salle brothers were involved in an educational mission in the town of Turón in Asturias, living in a community there and teaching in a church school. The Brothers were known to defy the ban on teaching religion and were openly escorting their students to Sunday Mass.

Incident
In October 1934, following the calling of a general strike, the miners of Asturias began to arm and organize themselves, occupying several towns and setting up "revolutionary committees."  The Brothers' school was an irritant to the insurrectionists in charge of operations in Turón because of the religious influence it ostensibly exerted on the young. On Friday 5 October 1934, they forced their way into the school on the pretext of inspecting whether arms had been hidden inside. They arrested all the Brothers present, as well as a Passionist priest who was visiting to hear confessions.

During the next days, they were tried by a revolutionary court  and sentenced to death. On 9 October 1934, in the early hours of the morning, they were executed and then buried in a common grave.

The miners' revolt collapsed shortly after the event, defeated by government troops, with over 3,000 miners killed in the process. The government forces were led by General Francisco Franco, who would himself rebel against the government two years later.

Canonization
The nine martyrs of Turon  were venerated on 7 September 1989, and beatified By Pope John Paul II on 29 April 1990. They were canonized on 21 November 1999. 
Their memorial day is 9 October.

The nine are  regarded by the Catholic church as Martyrs of the Spanish Civil War. Although their deaths occurred two years prior to the outbreak of the war, it was part and parcel of the communal violence that was a feature of the conflict, and the times before and after. Of the 6,000 religious persons killed during the Spanish Civil War about one thousand have had their causes advanced  for beatification, though the Martyrs of Turon were the first to be canonized.

The cause for the Martyrs of Turon has been linked to that of Jaime Hilario,  who was tried, convicted, and executed in 1937 for being a member of the De La Salle Brothers and was canonized by the Catholic Church on the same day as were the nine martyrs of Turon.

List
The Martyrs of Turon were:
 Brother Cirilo Bertrán, director of the community of Turón, born José Sanz Tejedor on 20 March 1888 at Lerma, in the province of Burgos.
 Brother Marciano-José, born Filomeno Lopez Lopez on 17 November 1900 at El Pedregal (Guadalajara).
 Brother Julian-Alfredo, born Vilfrido Fernández Zapico on 24 December 1903 at Cifuentes de Rueda, Léon.
 Brother Victoriano-Pio, born Claudio Bernabé Cano on 7 July 1905 at San Milian de Lara, Burgos.
 Brother Benjamin-Julian, born Vicente Alonso Andrés on 7 October 1908 at Jaramillo de la Fuente, Burgos.
 Brother Benito de Jesús, born Héctor Valdivielso Sáez on 31 October 1910 in Buenos Aires, Argentina, the first Argentine saint.
 Brother Augusto-Andrés, born Román Martínez Fernández on 9 May 1910 at Santander
 Brother Aniceto-Adolfo, at twenty years old, the youngest Brother of the community, born Manuel Seco Gutierrez in October  1912 at Celada Marlantes, Santander.
 Father Inocencio de la Inmaculada Concepción, Passionist Father who had come to hear confessions, born  Manuel Canoura Arnau on 10 March 1887 at S. Cecilia del Valle de Oro, near the Cantabrian coast in the province of Lugo, Galicia.

See also
Martyrs of the Spanish Civil War
Red Terror (Spain)

References

Sources
 Vatican report on canonization
  Nine martyrs at SQPN.com

Lists of Christian martyrs
Martyrs of the Spanish Civil War
Red Terror (Spain)
Argentine Roman Catholic saints
Spanish Roman Catholic saints
20th-century venerated Christians
Martyred groups
History of Catholicism in Spain
Lasallian saints
Passionists
Canonized Roman Catholic religious brothers
Beatifications by Pope John Paul II
Canonizations by Pope John Paul II